South Korea boy group Ateez have released three studio albums, eleven extended plays and twenty-four singles. They debuted in October 2018 with Treasure EP.1: All to Zero, marking the opening of the five-part Korean-language Treasure album series. They caught international attention early in their career, which their second EP, Treasure EP.2: Zero to One, landed at number seven on the Billboard's Heatseekers Albums Chart and number five on the World Albums Chart. Studio album Treasure EP.Fin: All to Action became their first to top the South Korea Gaon Album Chart. The group released the first Japanese-language album Treasure EP.Extra: Shift the Map in December 2019.

Ateez later released the Fever album series in four instalments. Their July 2020 release Zero: Fever Part.1 was the first to be certified platinum by the Korea Music Content Association. The next EPs, Zero: Fever Part.2 and Zero: Fever Part.3, were both certified double platinum in 2021. Zero: Fever Part.3 and Zero: Fever Epilogue charted at number 42 and 73 respectively on the Billboard 200 main chart in the United States. Ateez have sold over four million physical albums worldwide. They were the 10th best album selling male artist in South Korea in 2020, and the 8th overall best album seller in the country in 2021.

Albums

Studio albums

Extended plays

Single albums

Singles

As lead artist

Promotional singles

Other charted songs

Soundtrack appearances

Videography

Music videos

Other videos

Notes

References

External links
 Official website 

Discographies of South Korean artists
K-pop music group discographies